Ghulam Mohi-ud-Din Ghaznavi (1902-1975|) was a Sufi scholar and first custodian of Nerian Sharif.

He was born in 1902 in Ghazni , Afghanistan. His father's name was Mohammad Akbar Khan. He died on Friday 11 April 1975  after the Jummah prayer. He was 73 years old.

See also 
Alauddin Siddiqui

References 

Pakistani Sufi saints
Pakistani Sunni Muslim scholars of Islam
Pakistani Sufis
1902 births
1975 deaths
Pakistani Islamic religious leaders
Pakistani Islamists
Muslim missionaries
Sufism
Barelvis
People from Azad Kashmir